The following are the football (soccer) events of the year 1966 throughout the world.

Events
Copa Libertadores 1966: Won by Peñarol after defeating River Plate on an aggregate score of 4–2.
Real Madrid won the European Cup defeating Partizan 2–1.
November 6 – Johan Cruijff becomes the first player in history of the Netherlands national football team who receives a red card, when he is expelled by East-German referee Rudi Glöckner in the friendly against Czechoslovakia.

Winners club national championship

Asia
 : Al-Maref

Europe
 : FC Admira Wacker Mödling
 : Anderlecht
 Czechoslovakia: Dukla Prague
 : Liverpool
 : Nantes
 : Inter Milan
 : Ajax
 : Sporting C.P.
 : Dynamo Kiev
 : Celtic
 : Atlético Madrid
 : FC Zürich
 : Beşiktaş J.K.
 : TSV 1860 München
 : FK Vojvodina

North America
 : América

South America
 : Racing Club
 : Cruzeiro

International tournaments
1966 British Home Championship (October 2, 1965 – April 2, 1966)

 FIFA World Cup in England (July 11 – 29 1966)

Clubs Founded
PAS Giannina (Greece)

Births

 January 13 – Gerardo Esquivel, Mexican footballer
 January 15 – Rommel Fernández, Panamanian striker (d. 1993)
 January 29 – Romário, Brazilian footballer
 February 1 – Michelle Akers, American footballer
 February 4 – Egidio Notaristefano, Italian footballer and manager
 February 8 – Hristo Stoichkov, Bulgarian footballer
 March 27 – Ramiro Castillo, Bolivian footballer (d. 1997)
 April 2 – Teddy Sheringham, English footballer
 April 9 –  Thomas Doll, German footballer and manager
 May 12 – Vladimir Quesada, Costa Rican footballer
 May 24 – Eric Cantona, French footballer
 May 30 – Thomas Häßler, German footballer
 June 6 – Fernando Kanapkis, Uruguayan footballer
 June 12 – Albeiro Usuriaga (died 2004), Colombian footballer
 June 14 – Nelson Cossio, Chilean footballer
 June 14 – Byron Tenorio, Ecuadorian footballer
 June 21 – Guillermo Sanguinetti, Uruguayan footballer
 June 29 – Massimo Brambati, Italian footballer
 July 1 – Frank De Bleeckere, Belgian soccer referee
 July 5 – Gianfranco Zola, Italian international footballer
 July 7 – Henk Fräser, Dutch footballer
 July 28 – Miguel Ángel Nadal, Spanish footballer
 August 2 – Anzor Koblev, Russian professional football coach and former player
 August 13 – Miguel Miranda, Peruvian footballer
 August 22 – Michel van Oostrum, Dutch footballer
 August 22 – Rob Witschge, Dutch international footballer
 October 5 – Wilfred Agbonavbare, Nigerian international footballer (died 2015)
 October 16 – Stefan Reuter, German international footballer
 October 19 – José Carpio, Ecuadorian football referee
 November 10 – Michael Voss, former cricketer at CricketArchive
 December 3 – Flemming Povlsen, Danish international footballer

Deaths

 March 27 – Hermann Garrn, German forward, capped 2 times for the Germany national football team (78)
 April 29 – Sílvio Lagreca, Brazilian manager, first ever manager of the Brazil national football team (70)
 May 2 – Agostinho Fortes Filho, Brazilian midfielder, squad member at the 1930 FIFA World Cup (64)
 September 17 – Mário Filho, Brazilian legendary football journalist who revolutionized football coverage in Brazil. The Maracanã Stadium was named after him after his death (58)
 December 26 – Guillermo Stábile, Argentine striker, runner-up and top scorer of the 1930 FIFA World Cup (61)

References

 
Association football by year